Léon Nicole (10 April 1887 in Montcherand, Vaud – 28 June 1965 in Geneva) was a prominent trade unionist, journalist, politician and member of the Grand Council of Geneva and the Swiss National Council. In 1933, he was a member of the first Cantonal government in Switzerland with a Socialist majority and the first socialist ever elected to lead a Canton.  He was elected the first President of the Swiss Party of Labour in 1944.  In 1952 he was expelled from the Party of Labour for expressing sympathy towards Yugoslavia and in 1954 set up a rival communist party called the Progressive Party.

Early life 
Nicole attended school in his home village and Orbe before leaving for further education in St. Gallen. He worked in the postal service from 1905 to 1919, stationed in Geneva from 1911 and was a union leader between 1919 and 1921.  He was editor of several socialist newspapers including Labour and Workers' Voice.

Political career 
Nicole joined the Swiss Socialist Party in 1909 and was active as a trade unionist.  He was one of the leaders of the 1918 general strike in Geneva, was imprisoned and subsequently acquitted by a military court in 1919.

In 1919 he was elected to the National Council as a representative of the Socialist Party.  He was also elected to the Grand Council of Geneva in 1919.

In 1933, he was the first Socialist to be elected leader of a canton of Switzerland, when on 3 December he was voted into the Présidence (Presidency) of the Geneva Council of State, the executive body of the Republic and Canton of Geneva.

References

External links
 

1887 births
1965 deaths
Swiss Party of Labour politicians
Canton of Vaud politicians